Municipal election were held in Delhi on 4 December 2022 to elect 250 councillors of Municipal Corporation of Delhi. The votes were counted and the results were declared on 7 December 2022.

The Aam Aadmi Party won a simple majority in the corporation. This was the first election to the municipal corporation since its reunification in May 2022.

Background 

The tenure of NDMC, SDMC and EDMC came to an end on 18 May 2022.  The previous municipal elections were held in April 2017 to elect the councillors of the 3 municipal corporations.

Re-merger of municipal corporations 
In March 2022, the state Election Commission indefinitely deferred the municipal elections that were scheduled to be held in April 2022.  On 22 March, the Union Government approved the Delhi Municipal Corporation (Amendment) Bill to merge the 3 municipal corporations back to a single body. The unified Municipal Corporation of Delhi formally came into existence from 22 May 2022.

Events
The State Election Commission in Delhi had been preparing for the Delhi Municipal Elections had issued multiple notices, notifications and orders that had indicated that the election was planned to be conducted in April 2022.

On March 9, 2022, the State Election Commission  announced a press conference at 5 pm to declare the schedule of the Municipal elections to be conducted in April. After the announcement, the commission received an unofficial communication from the Lt. Governor of Delhi Anil Baijal that  talked about plans of the union government to merge the three municipal bodies. No formal communication had been issued regarding the plans for merger nor any such agenda had been declared in the ongoing budget session of the parliament of India. After the communication by Baijal, the press conference to announce the election schedule was postponed indefinitely and the elections were deferred.

Delhi CM Arvind Kejriwal accused the BJP of using the unification as an excuse to postpone the elections. He stated, "Can they cancel civic polls citing this reason? If today they are giving such reasons to stop a small election, tomorrow they will delay state and national elections too."

Delimitation exercise
Delhi Municipal Corporation (Amendment) Bill, 2022  proposed a reduction in the number of councillor seats to “not more than 250 seats” from the existing 272. A  three-member delimitation committee was constituted on July 8, 2022. It was required to complete the exercise and submit its report within four months from the date of its constitution. State Election Commissioner Vijay Dev leads the committee. The average size of the ward would be around 65,000. Each assembly constituency shall be divided into a minimum of three wards and the principal of average population may not be maintained throughout, therefore a deviation to the extent of plus or minus ten per cent may be acceptable to the Union Government of India. The total population of the corporation (2011 census) shall be divided by the total number of wards and the average population of each ward shall be obtained. The number of seats reserved for members of Scheduled Castes shall bear the same ratio to the total number of seats as the population of Scheduled Castes bears to the total population of Delhi. The Delimitation commission uses digitised maps of Geospatial Delhi Limited (GSDL).

Lawsuit to conduct the election
The Aam Aadmi Party (AAP) moved to the Supreme Court. It sought that directions be given to the State election Commission to conduct a fair and speedy election without interference from the Union government. The plea was filed by AAP leaders Ankush Narang and Manoj Kumar Tyagi. The plea asked that the election be conducted according to the planned schedule of the Election commission before the term of the Municipal corporations expires in May.  

The plea stated, "The elections have been pushed in the eleventh hour solely on an informal intimation to the State Election Commission. The State Election Commission has been set up as an independent constitutional authority to insulate it from political caprices and whims so that it can conduct free, fair and timely elections. Such arbitrary and sudden change in an election schedule solely on the say of the government is a clear violation of the fundamental democratic tenet of impartial conduct of elections". The plea called the incident, "brazen influence of the Government of India over the State Election Commission and its flagrant meddling with the conduct of Municipal Elections". The plea accused the Union government of infringing upon the independence of the election commission by being the only reason to delay the election.  

AAP called the indefinite deferral completely arbitrary and asked the court if elections with a prepared schedule could be deferred with such unofficial communications "at the whim of the Central government".

State Election Commission response
On 23 March, Indian Express cited unnamed sources and reported that the election commission had approached lawyers to advise it if the elections could take place amid the Union government's intention to unify the corporations. According to the report, the lawyers had advised the commission to wait until the ongoing parliament session ended. Accordingly, the commission was reported to make a decision on the election in the second week of April. The report also mentioned that the reorganization of wards in Delhi may be possible and this may lead to a delay in the elections.

Lawsuit demanding the use of a voting machine with paper trail 
In March 2022, Aam Aadmi Party asked the authorities conducting elections to use Electronic Voting Machines (EVM) that were compatible with Voter Verifiable Paper Audit Trail (VVPAT). The State Election Commission Delhi responded saying it had decided to hold the 2022 MCD Elections with second-generation M-2 EVMs without VVPAT. 

A petition was filed in the Delhi High Court by the Aam Aadmi Party MLA Saurabh Bhardwaj, in which he asked the HC to direct the State Election Commission of Delhi to conduct MCD elections with Electronic Voting Machines (EVM) that were compatible with Voter Verifiable Paper Audit Trail (VVPAT) and not without them. His lawyers said that it was almost impossible to check the accuracy of the EVM and tampering could not be ruled out when the EVMs without VVPAT machines were used.

In the case Subramanian Swamy vs Election Commission of India, (2013), the Supreme Court of India had issued directions that recognized the use of a system of paper trail in the EVMs was an important requirement for free and fair elections. The petition called the use of older second generation, M-2 EVMs by the state election commission as a contravention of the Supreme court direction, "manifestly wrong" and a "colourable exercise of power". AAP petitioned that the decision raised "genuine apprehension about the sanctity of the entire electoral process".

The petition noted, "There is no Assembly Election slated after 7th March 2022 anywhere in the country. As such there is no hassle for them to loan out this new generation EVMs, compatible to VVPAT, to the SEC Delhi for conducting the MCD Elections 2022" 

State Election Commission (SEC) stated that it was dependent on the Election Commission of India (ECI) for the supply of EVMs. ECI had given M2 EVMs without VVPAT to SEC. SEC said in the court that it had no objections in using EVM with VVPAT if the ECI provided it.

The Election Commission of India opposed the plea in the court and stated that it could not provide the EVM with VVPAT to the State Election commission as it used them for conducting elections and could not allow use by agencies that it did not supervise.

AAP said in court that EVMs procured by the SEC are not compatible with VVPAT and it asked for the disclosure of the number of VVPAT-compatible machines available in India. HC asked the SEC to inform the court which of the procured EVMs were compatible with VVPAT. Ten day time was given to respond and the next hearing was scheduled for 29 April.

Schedule
The election schedule was announced by the Delhi State Election Commission on 4 November 2022.

Parties and alliances









Others

Candidates 

AAP released the first list of 134 candidates on 11 November 2022. The second list of 117 candidates was released on 12 November 2022 in which one candidate from the first list was replaced.

BJP released the first list of 232 candidates on 12 November 2022. The second list of 18 candidates was released on 14 November 2022. BJP replaced 7 candidates on 14 November 2022.

Congress released the first list of 249 candidates on 13 November 2022. Candidate for 1 remaining seat and replacements for 3 candidates from the first list was released on 14 November 2022. Nominations of 3 Congress candidates was rejected during scrutiny.

Exit polls

Results

Results by Party  
Results were announced on 8 December 2022.

Result by ward

See also 

 2022 Elections in India
 2020 Delhi Legislative Assembly election

Notes

References

Delhi
Local elections in Delhi
D
2020s in Delhi